Head-coupled perspective is a technique to show 3D imagery on 2D devices. The perspective of the scene on the screen is based on the position of the user’s eyes, simulating a 3D environment. When the user moves their head, the perspective of the scene changes, creating the effect of looking through a window to the scene instead of looking at a flat projection of a scene.

See also 
 3D rendering
 3D computer graphics
 Perspective (visual)
 Eye tracking
 Video tracking
 Amazon Fire Phone's Dynamic Perspective

References

External links 
 http://iihm.imag.fr/francone/i3D/
 Paper on using head coupled perspective on mobile devices
 Early research on head coupled perspective
 A system based on head coupled perspective to give the illusion of a 3D virtual world all around a user

Stereoscopy